Major General James Noel Thomson   (December 1888 – 3 May 1979) was a British Army officer who served during World War I and World War II.

Military career
Born in December 1888, James Noel Thomson was educated at Fettes College, and later attended the Royal Military Academy, Woolwich, from where he was commissioned into the Royal Field Artillery in 1909. He served in France from 9 September 1914 mostly on the Staff during World War I, earning the Military Cross and, in 1917, the Distinguished Service Order, in addition to being mentioned in dispatches three times.

The war over due to the Armistice of 11 November 1918, Thomson remained in the army during the interwar period, where, from 1919 to 1920, he served as adjutant at the Royal Military College, Sandhurst, which was followed shortly after by his attendance at the Staff College, Camberley from 1920 to 1921. Imperial Defence College in 1932.

As part of Iraqforce (Paiforce), Major-General Thomson commanded the Indian 6th Infantry Division during Anglo-Soviet invasion of Persia.

He retired a Colonel (Honorary Major General) 14 August 1946

Command history
 1934–1937: Assistant Master-General of Ordnance, India
 1938–1941: Brigadier General Staff, Northern Command, India
 1939: Aide-de-Camp to the King
 1941–1943: General Officer Commanding, 6th Indian Infantry Division, Iraq and Persia
 1943: Deputy Master-General of Ordnance, India
 1946: Retired

Family
James was the son of Sarah Elizabeth née Stuart and James Thomson, Iron founder of Old Machar. He married in 1929 at Shimla Lorna Carmen Buck (1902–?) daughter of Anne Margaret née Jennings (1874–?) and Sir Edward John Buck CBE (1862–1948) a Special Correspondent of Reuter's Press Agency and author of 'Simla, Past and Present'.

See also
 Iraqforce

References

Bibliography

External links
Generals of World War II

1888 births
1979 deaths
Royal Artillery officers
British Army personnel of World War I
British Army generals of World War II
Companions of the Distinguished Service Order
Companions of the Order of the Bath
Recipients of the Military Cross
Graduates of the Staff College, Camberley
Graduates of the Royal Military Academy, Woolwich
Graduates of the Royal College of Defence Studies
People educated at Fettes College
Academics of the Royal Military College, Sandhurst
British Army major generals